Nicklas Tyrone Lasu (born 16 September 1989) is a Swedish professional ice hockey forward, currently playing for Frölunda HC in Swedish Hockey League (SHL). He formerly played with Oulun Kärpät in the Liiga.

Playing career
Lasu was selected by the Atlanta Thrashers in the fifth round of the 2008 NHL Entry Draft and was part of the Swedish team at the 2009 World Junior Championship in Ottawa, Canada.

Lasu isn't very big, but plays with a ton of grit and energy. He leads by example on the ice and can deliver a few big hits. He can skate really fast and is excellent on the penalty kill. Is a great shot blocker and can do a bit of agitation at times. Can play all three forward positions.

After two successful seasons with Kärpät, Lasu left after the 2018–19 campaign, opting to return home to Sweden signing a four-year contract with original club, Frölunda HC, on 10 May 2019.

Personal
Lasu is a cousin of former Frölunda HC player Magnus Kahnberg. His father is Tyrone Lasu.

Career statistics

Regular season and playoffs

International

Awards and honors

References

External links
 

1989 births
Living people
Atlanta Thrashers draft picks
Borås HC players
Frölunda HC players
Oulun Kärpät players
Swedish ice hockey centres